Zoltán Nemere (20 April 1942 – 6 May 2001) was a Hungarian fencer. He won gold medals in the team épée events at the 1964 and 1968 Summer Olympics.

References

External links
 

1942 births
2001 deaths
Hungarian male épée fencers
Olympic fencers of Hungary
Fencers at the 1964 Summer Olympics
Fencers at the 1968 Summer Olympics
Olympic gold medalists for Hungary
Olympic medalists in fencing
Medalists at the 1964 Summer Olympics
Medalists at the 1968 Summer Olympics
Universiade medalists in fencing
Universiade gold medalists for Hungary
Medalists at the 1965 Summer Universiade
20th-century Hungarian people
21st-century Hungarian people